Chilabothrus granti, the Virgin Islands boa, is a species of snake in the family Boidae. It is native to Puerto Rico, the British Virgin Islands, and the U.S. Virgin Islands.

References 

Chilabothrus
Reptiles of Puerto Rico
Reptiles described in 1933
Taxa named by Olive Griffith Stull